Aristofusus excavatus, common name apricot spindle, is a species of sea snail, a marine gastropod mollusk in the family Fasciolariidae, the spindle snails, the tulip snails and their allies.

Description
Aristofusus excavatus has a shell reaching a size of 60 – 86 mm. The surface of this spindle-shaped shell is yellowish, with darker yellowish areas.

Distribution
This species can be found in southeastern United States and from the Gulf of Mexico to northeastern Brazil. It lives on sandy and mud bottoms at depths from 30 to 160 m.

References

External links
 Sowerby, G. B., II. (1842-1887). Thesaurus Conchyliorum: Or monographs of genera of shells. London, privately published: vol. 1: p. 1-438, pl. 1-91 [cover date 1847]; vol. 2: p. 439 899, pl. 92-186 [cover date 1855]; vol. 3: p. 1-331, pl. 187-290 [cover date: 1866]; vol. 4 p. 1-110, pl. 292-423 [cover date 1880]; vol. 5: p. 1-305, pl. 424-517 [cover date 1887] - Details of dates in Petit R.E. 2009 Zootaxa 2189: 35-37
 Dall W.H. 1889. Reports on the results of dredging, under the supervision of Alexander Agassiz, in the Gulf of Mexico (1877-78) and in the Caribbean Sea (1879-80), by the U.S. Coast Survey Steamer "Blake", Lieut.-Commander C.D. Sigsbee, U.S.N., and Commander J.R. Bartlett, U.S.N., commanding. XXIX. Report on the Mollusca. Part 2, Gastropoda and Scaphopoda. Bulletin of the Museum of Comparative Zoölogy at Harvard College, 18: 1-492, pls. 10-40
 
 Encyclopedia of life
 John W Tunnell Jr, Jean Andrews, Noe C. Barrera   Encyclopedia of Texas Seashells: Identification, Ecology, Distribution
  Rosenberg, G.; Moretzsohn, F.; García, E. F. (2009). Gastropoda (Mollusca) of the Gulf of Mexico, Pp. 579–699 in: Felder, D.L. and D.K. Camp (eds.), Gulf of Mexico–Origins, Waters, and Biota. Texas A&M Press, College Station, Texas

excavatus
Gastropods described in 1880